Grietje "Gré" de Jongh (2 November 1924 – 6 February 2002) was a Dutch sprinter. She competed at the 1948 and 1952 Summer Olympics in four events in total: 100 m, 200 m (twice) and 4 × 100 m relay and finished in sixth place in the relay. She won a silver medal in this event at the 1950 European Athletics Championships.

References

1924 births
2002 deaths
Athletes (track and field) at the 1948 Summer Olympics
Athletes (track and field) at the 1952 Summer Olympics
Dutch female sprinters
Olympic athletes of the Netherlands
People from Oostzaan
European Athletics Championships medalists
Olympic female sprinters
Sportspeople from North Holland
20th-century Dutch women
21st-century Dutch women